This is a list of bands described as extreme metal.

A
Aeternus
Agalloch
Agathodaimon
Alastis
All Pigs Must Die
Amon Amarth
Anaal Nathrakh
Anathema
Anthrax
At the Gates

B
Bathory
Behemoth
Bethlehem
Black Breath
Black Label Society
Black Sabbath
Blood Divine
Burzum

C
Cannibal Corpse
Carcass
Cathedral
Celtic Frost
Children of Bodom
Converge
Cradle of Filth

D
Dark Age
Dark Funeral
Dark Tranquility
Darkthrone
Death
Deathstars
Deicide
Dissection

E
Eisregen
Entombed
Exhumed
Exmortus
Exodus

F
Fear Factory
Freax

G
Godflesh
Gojira
Gorgoroth

H
Hellhammer
High on Fire

K
Kataklysm
Katatonia
Kreator

L
Lacuna Coil
Lake of Tears
Lamb of God
Lillian Axe
Living Sacrifice
Lorna Shore

M
Mayhem
Megadeth
Mercyful Fate
Meshuggah
Metallica
Moonsorrow
Moonspell
My Dying Bride

N
Nails
Napalm Death
Nevermore

O
Orphaned Land
The Ocean

P
Pig Destroyer
Possessed
Psychotic Waltz

R
Red Harvest
Rotting Christ

S
Sarcófago
Scarve
Sculptured
Sepultura
Silentium
Skeletonwitch
Slayer
Solution 13
Strapping Young Lad
Symphony of Heaven

T
Terrorizer
The Axis of Perdition
The Gathering
The Old Dead Tree
Therion
Tiamat
Tool

U
Unexpect
Unleash the Archers

V
Venom
Virgin Black

Y
Yearning

References

Lists of bands